Kedar Shah (born 23 March 1923) was an Indian water polo player. He competed in the men's tournament at the 1952 Summer Olympics.

References

External links
 

1923 births
Possibly living people
Indian male water polo players
Olympic water polo players of India
Water polo players at the 1952 Summer Olympics
Place of birth missing (living people)